The FA Cup 1960–61 is the 80th season of the world's oldest football knockout competition; The Football Association Challenge Cup, often abbreviated to the FA Cup, or FACC, for short. The large number of clubs entering the tournament from lower down the English football league system meant that the competition started with a number of preliminary and qualifying rounds. The 30 victorious teams from the Fourth Round Qualifying progressed to the First Round Proper.

Preliminary round

Ties

Replay

1st qualifying round

Ties

Replays

2nd qualifying round

Ties

Replays

2nd replays

3rd qualifying round

Ties

Replays

2nd replay

4th qualifying round
The teams that given byes to this round were Crook Town, Bishop Auckland, Wycombe Wanderers, Bedford Town, Yeovil Town, Hereford United, South Shields, Worcester City, Oxford United, King's Lynn Town, Guildford City, Chelmsford City, Rhyl, Blyth Spartans, Dorchester Town, Margate, Bath City, Boston United, Wisbech Town, Tooting & Mitcham United, Walthamstow Avenue, Enfield, Salisbury and Ashford Town (Kent).

Ties

Replays

1960–61 FA Cup
See 1960-61 FA Cup for details of the rounds from the First Round Proper onwards.

External links
 Football Club History Database: FA Cup 1960–61
 FA Cup Past Results

Qual